Axel Dünnwald-Metzler (9 December 1939 in Stuttgart – 6 April 2004 same place) was a German footballer and the honorary president of Stuttgarter Kickers. He was the president of the kickers from May 1979 till July 2003. He was succeeded by 1941 born Hans Kullen. He died at the age of 64 from lung cancer.

References

External links
Profile at kickersarchiv.de

1939 births
2004 deaths
German footballers
Stuttgarter Kickers players
Association football midfielders
Footballers from Stuttgart